Riisnæs is a surname. Notable people with the surname include:

Anne Eline Riisnæs (born 1951), Norwegian pianist and piano pedagog
Dag Riisnæs (born 1969), Norwegian footballer
Eline Nygaard Riisnæs (1913–2011), Norwegian pianist and musicologist
Knut Riisnæs (born 1945), Norwegian musician, arranger, and composer
Odd Riisnæs (born 1953), Norwegian musician and composer
Sverre Riisnæs (1897–1988), Norwegian jurist, public prosecutor, and Nazi collaborator